The following is a list of people from Waterford, Ireland.

Ecclesiastics
Richard Chenevix (1697–1779), Church of Ireland bishop
Charles Joseph Henderson (1924–2006), Auxiliary Bishop of Southwark (UK) and Bishop of Tricala
Tobias Kirby (1804–1895), Rector of the Irish College Rome 1850–1891; archbishop of Ephesus 1885
Michael O'Hickey (1860–1916), priest, Professor of Irish at Maynooth University
Nicholas Quemerford (c. 1554–1599), Irish Jesuit priest
Edmund Ignatius Rice (1762–1844), religious founder
Michael Sheehan, Archbishop of Germia; author, professor
Luke Wadding (1588–1657), theologian, historian, patriot
Michael Wadding, priest
Nicholas Wiseman (1802–1865), cardinal

Sport
Jim Beglin (born 1963), soccer player
Craig Breen (born 1990), rally driver
Niamh Briggs (born 1984), Irish international rugby player
Locky Byrne (1913–1941), hurler
Tom Cheasty (1934–2007), hurler
Paddy Coad (1920–1992), soccer player
Tom Cunningham (born 1931), hurler
Pat Fanning (1918–2010), hurler, GAA President
Mick Flannelly (1930–2021), hurler
Andy Fleming (1916–2011), hurler
Austin Flynn (1933–2021), hurler
Philly Grimes (1929–1989), hurler
Larry Guinan (born 1938), hurler
Alfie Hale (born 1939), soccer player
Noel Hunt (born 1982), Irish international soccer player
Stephen Hunt (born 1981), Irish international soccer player
John Keane (1917–1975), hurler
Sean Kelly (born 1956), Ireland's most successful racing cyclist, one of the top eight cyclists of all time
Martin Óg Morrissey (born 1934), hurler
Christy Moylan (1916–1996), hurler
Daryl Murphy (born 1983), Irish international soccer player
Johnny O'Connor (1928–2010), hurler
Peter O'Connor (1872–1957), athlete, Olympic champion
John O'Shea (born 1981), Irish international soccer player
Ciarán Power (born 1976), Olympic Games cyclist 2000, 2004
Ned Power (1929–2007), hurler
Seamus Power (1929–2016), hurler
Susan Smith-Walsh (born 1971), Olympic athlete
John Treacy (born 1957), Olympic athlete, world champion
Frankie Walsh (1936–2012), hurler
Patricia Walsh (born 1960), Olympic athlete
Charlie Ware (1933–2013), hurler
Jim Ware (1908–1983), hurler
Thomas Barr (born 1992), Olympic athlete
Jessie Barr (born 1989), Olympic athlete

Politics and military
Mary Butler (born 1966), politician
William Charles Bonaparte-Wyse (1826–1892), soldier
Denis Cashman (1843–1897), Fenian, patriot
Hugh Collender, Young Irelander, businessman
Ciara Conway (born 1980)
Paudie Coffey (born 1969), Minister of State for Housing and planning from 2014 to 2016
Edward Collins (1941–2019)
Maurice Cummins
David Cullinane
Lorraine Clifford-Lee
John Condon, boy soldier, youngest Allied soldier to die in First World War
Martin Cullen, politician
John Deasy
Austin Deasy
Frank Edwards, left wing activist, Spanish Civil War fighter
Francis Hearn, patriot
John Hearne, orator, lawyer and architect of the 1937 Irish Constitution, or Bunracht na hÉireann
William Hobson, first Governor of New Zealand
Brendan Kenneally
Billy Kenneally
Thomas Kyne
George Lennon, vice commanding officer, West Waterford I.R.A. (1919–1922)
Patrick Little, politician
Thaddeus Lynch
Thomas Francis Meagher, patriot, conceived the Irish tricolour
Thomas Meagher politician and businessman
Richard Mulcahy, Irish Army C.O.C.
Ann Ormonde
William Palliser (1830–1882), politician, inventor
John Paul Phelan (born 1978), politician
John Redmond (1856–1918), leader of the Irish Party in Westminster
Frederick Roberts, 1st Earl Roberts (1832–1914), British Army C.O.C.
Thomas Sexton (1848–1932), journalist, financial expert, nationalist politician and Member of Parliament
Richard Lalor Shiel (1791–1851), Orator, M.P
Alfred Webb (1834–1908), President of the 1894 Indian National Congress and MP for West Waterford

Science
Lucien Bonaparte-Wyse (1845–1909), entomologist
Robert Boyle (1627–1691), physicist
Richard J. Ussher (1841–1913), ornithologist
Ernest Walton (1903–1995), Nobel Laureate (Physics 1951)

Arts, theatre and entertainment
Keith Barry, magician, mentalist, illusionist
Carrie Crowley, TV personality
Teresa Deevy, playwright
Val Doonican, entertainer
Seán Dunne, poet
Fiona Glascott
Dorothea Jordan, actress; mistress of King William IV of the United Kingdom
Charles Kean, Shakespearean actor
Anna Manahan (1924–2009), actress
Gerardine Meaney (born 1962), feminist critic

Gilbert O'Sullivan, singer-songwriter
Patrick C. Power, writer and historian
Hal Roach, comedian
Frank Ryan (1900–1965), tenor
William Vincent Wallace (1814–1865), opera composer

General
Eugene Byrne (born 1959), author, journalist
Risteard De Hindeberg (1863–1916), priest, Irish language activist, author, musician
Grattan Flood (1857–1928), musicologist and historian
Valentine Greatrakes, 17th-century healer
John Hogan (1800–1858), sculptor
Donnchadh Ruadh Mac Conmara (1715–1810), teacher, poet
Ellen Organ (1903–1908), saintly child known as "Little Nellie of Holy God"
Thomas Sautelle Roberts (c. 1749 – 1778), landscape artist

References

Waterford
 
People